Pterobunocephalus dolichurus is a species of banjo catfish found in Brazil and Peru where it is native to the Amazon River Basin.  It grows to a length of 6.7 cm.

References 
 

Aspredinidae
Fish of South America
Fish of Brazil
Fish of Peru
Fish described in 1941